Anna Korakaki (born 8 April 1996) is a Greek Olympic shooter.

Career
She represented Greece at the 2016 Summer Olympics, winning a gold medal in the 25m pistol shot event and a Bronze medal in the 10m air pistol shooting event. The Gold medal she won for Greece was following a hiatus since the last Gold medal won for Greece, at the 2004 Summer Olympics. Her Olympic distinctions include: she was the first Greek woman in her maiden appearance at an Olympics (then aged 20 years) to be a multi-Olympic medalist for Greece at the same Olympiad, a fete last achieved by a Greek Olympic athlete at the 1912 Summer Olympics with Konstantinos Tsiklitiras. In the 25m fire pistol event, Korakaki of Greece and Monika Karsch of Germany would vie for Gold medalist, each holding a tie or the lead with each succeeding round, and Korakaki would defeat Karsch after  She won three rounds thus getting a lead of 6–0, then the Germany rival won the next three rounds and thus bringing it to a 6–6 tie. In the last round, Germany missed 1st and 3rd shots of the 5 shots, and Korakaki had missed her 4th shot, but she hit her 5th shot and won 8–6, taking the gold and avoiding a tie.

Korakaki has competed since 2009. She is with the Orion Shooting Club of Thessaloniki  and she is coached by her father and retired shooter Tassos Korakakis. She is an undergraduate student in Special Education at the University of Macedonia in Thessaloniki.

On 12 March 2020, she became the first woman to be the originating Olympic athlete torchbearer of an Olympic torch relay.

International results
Korakaki has been a member of the Greece national shooting team since 2010. Distinguished results include:

 Gold and Bronze medalist at the 2016 Summer Olympics in Rio de Janeiro.
 Gold medal (10 m air pistol) and 9th place (25 m air pistol) at the 2018 World Championships in Changwon.
 Gold and two times Bronze medalist at the 2018 World Cup in Fort Benning. 
 Gold medalist at the 2018 World Cup Final in Guadalajara.
 Gold and Silver medalist at the 2016 World Cup in Bologna. In the 25m pistol, she won a Gold medal with an overall score of 39/50, beating South Korean Jangami Kim and Ukrainian Olena Kostevich who respectively won the Silver and Bronze medals.
 Gold and Silver medalist at the 2019 European Games in Minsk.
 Gold and Bronze medalist at the 2017 World Cup Final in Munich.
 Gold and Silver medalist at the 2016 Junior World Cup in Suhl.
 Gold medalist at the 2023 European Championship in Tallinn. 
 Gold medalist at the 2014 European Junior Championship in Moscow.
 Two time Silver medalist at the 2016 World Cup in Baku.
 Silver medalist at the 2015 European Games in Baku.
 Silver medalist at the 2015 World Cup Final in Munich.
 Silver medalist at the 2011 European Junior Championship in Belgrade.
 Bronze medalist at the 2015 World Cup in Fort Benning.
 Bronze medalist at the 2014 World Junior Championship in Granada.

Records

Personal life
After the Olympics, Anna Korakaki got a tattoo of the Olympic rings and the year on her right hand to remember her Rio achievements.

References

External links

 

1996 births
Living people
Greek female sport shooters
Medalists at the 2016 Summer Olympics
Olympic bronze medalists for Greece
Olympic gold medalists for Greece
Olympic medalists in shooting
Olympic shooters of Greece
Sportspeople from Drama, Greece
Shooters at the 2014 Summer Youth Olympics
Shooters at the 2016 Summer Olympics
ISSF pistol shooters
Mediterranean Games gold medalists for Greece
Mediterranean Games medalists in shooting
Competitors at the 2018 Mediterranean Games
Competitors at the 2022 Mediterranean Games
Shooters at the 2015 European Games
Shooters at the 2019 European Games
European Games medalists in shooting
European Games gold medalists for Greece
European Games silver medalists for Greece
University of Macedonia alumni
People from Nigrita
Shooters at the 2020 Summer Olympics
21st-century Greek women